The Forcible Entry Act 1429 (8 Hen 6 c 9) was an Act of the Parliament of the Kingdom of England. It is written in the Anglo-Norman language. It was expressed to be passed because the statute 15 Ric 2 c 2 was felt to be inadequate because it did not apply to persons committing forcible detainer after a peaceful entry or to persons who, having committed forcible detainer, had been expelled from the land before the justice of the peace arrived to arrest them, and because it did not provide for the punishment of a sheriff who failed to carry out the orders of the justice of the peace to execute the statute.

It was repealed, except in relation to criminal proceedings, by section 2 of the 42 & 43 Vict c 59.

See also
Forcible Entry Act

References
Halsbury's Statutes, Third Edition, volume 18, page 408

External links

Acts of the Parliament of England
1429 in England
1420s in law